Manuel Alfonso Andrade Oropeza (born November 3, 1989) is a Mexican professional wrestler who is currently signed to the American promotion All Elite Wrestling (AEW) under the ring name Andrade El Idolo (also stylized Andrade "El Ídolo"). He is also known for his appearances in Mexico for Consejo Mundial de Lucha Libre and in Japan for New Japan Pro-Wrestling as La Sombra (Spanish for "The Shadow"), and for his appearances with the United States-based promotion WWE as Andrade "Cien" Almas (later shortened to simply Andrade).

A third-generation professional wrestler, Andrade made his debut a month before his 14th birthday and worked under the name Brillante Jr. in reference to his father, who wrestled as Brillante. He spent eight years wrestling for Consejo Mundial de Lucha Libre (CMLL) under the name La Sombra, where he won the 2007 Torneo Gran Alternativa tournament and the 2011 Universal Championship and simultaneously held the Mexican National Trios Championship, NWA World Historic Welterweight Championship and CMLL World Tag Team Championship. He was one of the founding members of the los Ingobernables ("the Ungovernables") stable, and won the masks of El Felino, Olímpico and Volador Jr. by defeating them in Lucha de Apuestas matches before losing his own mask to Atlantis. Andrade also made appearances for New Japan Pro-Wrestling as part of a working agreement between CMLL and NJPW, winning the IWGP Intercontinental Championship.

Andrade joined WWE in 2015. He initially wrestled for its NXT brand under the ring name Andrade "Cien" Almas, winning the NXT Championship. In April 2018, he joined WWE's main roster where his ring name was shorted to simply "Andrade". Andrade held the WWE United States Championship for several months in 2019-2020. He departed WWE in March 2021, debuting in AAA and AEW that summer.

Early life 
Manuel Alfonso Andrade Oropeza was born in Gómez Palacio, Durango, on November 3, 1989. He is the son of Jose Andrade Salas, who wrestles as Brillante. He became part of the third generation of the Andrade family to compete in lucha libre. His grandfather, José Andrade, wrestled under the name "El Moro", while his uncles wrestle or wrestled under the names Diamante/Moro III (Sergio Andrade), Zafiro/Pentagoncito (real name unrevealed), Kevin (Juan Andrade), Espanto Jr./Pentagón (Jesús Andrade), and Espiritu Magico (Juan Andrade), and one of his cousins works as the current Espanto Jr. (real name unrevealed).

Professional wrestling career

Early career (2003–2007)
With his father, uncles and grandfather being involved in running a local lucha libre promotion and school in Durango, Andrade began training for a professional career from an early age, initially by playing around with his father and uncles, but later began to train seriously for a career in the wrestling ring. He made his professional wrestling debut on October 3, 2003, a month before his 14th birthday, but only after his father signed a waiver for the local boxing and wrestling commission to issue him a license. He began working under the ring name Brillante Jr. in honor of his father.

Working for his family's wrestling promotion Andrade used the name "Brillante Jr." from 2003 through early 2007. During that period of time, he got involved in a storyline rivalry with his uncle who wrestled as "Zafio", leading to his first ever Lucha de Apuestas, or bet match. By defeating Zafiro he won his first headline match, forcing Zafiro to have all his hair shaved off after the match per lucha libre traditions. He later won another Lucha de Apuestas match, forcing the masked wrestler Camorra to unmask in the middle of the ring and reveal his real name. During this time period Andrade also competed as the enmascarado (masked) characters "Guerrero Azteca" ("Aztec Warrior") and "Rey Azteca" ("Aztec King") on occasion.

Consejo Mundial de Lucha Libre

Técnico (2007–2014)

In 2007 he signed with Consejo Mundial de Lucha Libre ("World Wrestling Council"; CMLL), and began training under CMLL head trainer El Satánico. He made his CMLL in-ring debut on February 27, working as "Brillante" just like his father had. In June CMLL changed his name, rechristening him La Sombra ("The Shadow"). CMLL previously had other people work under the name "La Sombra" in the 1980s and 1990s; CMLL did not promote the most recent La Sombra as having any relation to the previous incarnations at all, although the relationship was later subtly acknowledged when La Sombra began wrestling in a black and silver version of his father's mask.

La Sombra quickly moved up the ranks of CMLL in the months after his debut. The first sign of CMLL putting their faith in La Sombra came when the promoters him teamed up with CMLL's main good guy (known as a técnico in Spanish) Místico for their annual Torneo Gran Alternativa ("Great Alternative Tournament") where a rookie and a veteran team up. La Sombra and Místico defeated Heavy Metal and Super Nova in the first round, Dr. Wagner Jr. and Mascara Purpura in the semi-final and the team of Último Guerrero and Euforia in the finals to win the 2007 Tornero Gran Alternativa. The following month, La Sombra teamed up with El Sagrado and Volador Jr. to defeat Mr. Águila, Damián 666, and Halloween, collectively known as Los Perros del Mal ("The Bad Dogs"), to win the Mexican National Trios Championship. On November 27, 2007, La Sombra added the NWA World Welterweight Championship to his collection when he defeated Hajime Ohara to win the title; his victory made him the youngest wrestler to hold the championship, winning it at the age of 18. Throughout 2008 La Sombra was busy defending both championships on several occasions. On January 16, 2009, La Sombra became a triple champion as he teamed up with Volador Jr. to defeat Averno and Mephisto, winning the CMLL World Tag Team Championship. La Sombra's time as a triple champion lasted just over two weeks, until February 3, when Sangre Azteca, Black Warrior, and Dragón Rojo Jr., collectively known as Poder Mexica ("Mexican Power") defeated La Sombra, Volador, and Sagrado to win the Mexican National Trios Championship. On May 27, 2009, La Sombra lost the NWA World Welterweight Championship to Mephisto.

In early 2010 La Sombra began a storyline feud with El Felino. The feud began on February 2, 2010, during a singles match between El Felino and La Sombra; when tied at one fall each, Puma King, El Felino's son, showed up wearing an El Felino outfit and mask, distracting both the referee and La Sombra long enough for El Felino to land a low blow on La Sombra to win the match. The two met in a Lighting match (a one fall, 10 minute time limit match) on the February 19 CMLL Super Viernes show. Once again Puma King tried to help his uncle, but this time the referee disqualified El Felino for the transgression. La Sombra and El Felino continued to feud, both interfering in a match between Volador Jr. and Místico. The storyline led to Místico, Volador Jr., La Sombra and El Felino being booked in a four-way Lucha de Apuestas match as the main event of the 2010 2010 Homenaje a Dos Leyendas ("Homage to Two Legends") show. La Sombra was the first man pinned at Dos Leyendas and El Felino was the second, forcing the two to compete with their masks on the line. La Sombra pinned El Felino, forcing him to unmask and reveal his real name.

On May 14, 2010, La Sombra teamed up with Máscara Dorada and La Máscara to defeat the then CMLL World Trios Champions La Ola Amarilla ("The Yellow Wave"; Hiroshi Tanahashi, Okumura, and Taichi) in a non-title match to earn a shot at the Championship the following week. One week later the trio defeated Ola Amarilla again, ending the Japanese trios title reign after just two weeks. On July 12, 2010, at the Promociones Gutiérrez 1st Anniversary Show La Sombra participated in a match where 10 men put their mask on the line in a match that featured five pareja incredibles ("Incredible Pairs") teams, with the losing team being forced to wrestle each other with their mask on the line. His partner in the match was Histeria, facing off against the teams of Atlantis and Olímpico, Místico and El Oriental, El Alebrije and Volador Jr., Último Guerrero and Averno. La Sombra and Histeria were the first team to escape the match and retain their masks. While La Sombra had traveled to Japan to participate in the 2010 Best of the Super Juniors (BOSJ) tournament Volador Jr. had begun showing rudo signs, but when La Sombra returned the two teamed back up without any signs of problems between the two

Sombra and Volador Jr. lost the CMLL World Tag Team Championship to the Los Invasores team of Mr. Águila and Héctor Garza on July 23, 2010, again without any signs of dissension between the two. During a later show Volador Jr. finally turned fully rudo when he attacked La Sombra and tore La Sombra's mask off, provoking a feud between the two longtime partners. La Sombra entered the 2010 Universal Championship tournament and qualified for the finals when he won "Block A" on the July 30, 2010 Super Viernes show by defeating Mephisto, El Texano Jr., and Último Guerrero. In the finals Jyushin Thunder Liger, with help from Okumura at ringside, defeated La Sombra to claim the tournament trophy. The unresolved issues between La Sombra and Volador Jr., as well as the storyline between La Sombra and Jyushin Thunder Liger, led to all three wrestlers being booked in the main event of the CMLL 77th Anniversary Show, a 14-man steel cage Lucha de Apuestas, mask vs. mask match. The match came down to Olímpico and La Sombra after the other 12 men had escaped the cage; La Sombra pinned Olímpico to force him to unmask.

On March 13, 2011, La Sombra defeated Mephisto to win the NWA World Historic Welterweight Championship. On July 15, La Generación Dorada lost the CMLL World Trios Championship to Los Hijos del Averno (Averno, Ephesto and Mephisto). On September 2, La Sombra entered CMLL's annual tournament of champions, the Universal Championship tournament. After defeating Mexican National Trios Champions Ángel de Oro and Diamante in his first two matches, La Sombra defeated NWA World Historic Light Heavyweight Champion Rey Bucanero in his block's finals to advance to the tournament finals. On September 16, La Sombra defeated Averno to become the 2011 Universal Champion. On February 13, 2012, La Sombra lost the NWA World Historic Welterweight Championship to Negro Casas, ending his reign at 337 days. On November 28, 2012, La Sombra won the advanced category in CMLL's annual bodybuilding contest. On December 14, La Sombra defeated Tama Tonga to win the 2012 La Copa Junior Tournament in the main event of CMLL's 2012 Sin Piedad ("No Mercy") show.

On February 15, 2013, La Sombra defeated Volador Jr. to win the 2013 Reyes del Aire tournament. Following their clash over the Reyes del Aire trophy Volador Jr. and La Sombra were teamed up for the 2013 Torneo Nacional de Parejas Increibles tournament, the same tournament that in 2010 was the impetus for Volador Jr.'s rudo turn. The rivals put their issues aside for the tournament, defeating the teams of Guerrero Maya Jr. and Negro Casas, La Máscara and Averno, and Shocker and Mr. Niebla to qualify for the finals of the tournament. On March 15, at the 2013 Homenaje a Dos Leyendas show, Volador Jr. and La Sombra defeated Altantis and Último Guerrero to win the Torneo Nacional de Parejas Increibles. The truce between La Sombra and Volador Jr. that allowed them to win the tag team tournament only lasted until the next time the two rivals were in the same ring. On February 17, 2013, La Sombra teamed up with Marco Corleone and Místico II against Volador Jr., Euforia and Último Guerrero. During the match Volador Jr. attacked both La Sombra and the referee, causing a disqualification before leaving the ring and his confused partners behind. On September 13 at CMLL's 80th Anniversary Show, La Sombra and Volador Jr. defeated Atlantis and Último Guerrero in a Relevos Suicidas match and thus advanced to a Mask vs. Mask Lucha de Apuestas against each other. In the end, La Sombra was victorious, forcing his rival to unmask.

Los Ingobernables (2014–2015)

The main event of the 80th Anniversary show was not well received by the fans as they had been expecting a match between Atlantis and Último Guerrero, loudly chanting "fraud" during the main event. After the match the fans rallied behind Volador Jr., giving him the crowd support that made CMLL return him to the técnico side. Conversely the fans began to boo and heckle La Sombra, the supposed técnico, leading to a change in how La Sombra was booked and presented by CMLL. La Sombra formed a partnership with Rush and effectively began working as a rudo, though the two refused to acknowledge themselves as such, instead referring to themselves as técnicos diferentes ("a different kind of good guy"). On June 6, La Sombra defeated Volador Jr. with help from Rush and La Máscara to win the NWA World Historic Welterweight Championship in a match, where La Sombra's Historic Middleweight Championship was also on the line. The trio of Sombra, Rush and La Máscara was eventually named Los Ingobernables ("The Ungovernables"). On August 1 at El Juicio Final, La Sombra lost the NWA World Historic Welterweight Championship back to Volador Jr. Later in August, La Sombra made it to the finals of the 2014 Universal Championship tournament, before losing to Último Guerrero. On May 1, 2015, La Sombra won the 2015 Reyes del Aire tournament ("Kings of the Air").

On July 21, La Sombra and Rush were involved in an incident in Guadalajara, where they attacked fans who were throwing beers at them during a match. The following day, Jalisco's Boxing and Wrestling Commission suspended the two from wrestling in the state for three months. While the commission only suspended them from wrestling in Jalisco, CMLL decided to pull both La Sombra and Rush from their Super Viernes show three days later. CMLL did not offer an official explanation for the change. Over the summer of 2015 Los Ingobernables started to wrestle against tecnico teams instead of generally facing rudo teams as they had been up to that point. By August 2015, Los Ingobernables found themselves facing off against Atlantis on multiple occasions, often with La Sombra going out of his way to attack Atlantis, tearing Atlantis' mask apart during matches to show his disdain for the veteran tecnico. On August 31, La Sombra lost the NWA World Historic Middleweight Championship to Último Guerrero, ending his two and a half year reign. In the main event of the CMLL 82nd Anniversary Show on September 18, 2015, La Sombra, the winner of the main event of the 80th Anniversary, put his mask on the line against the winner of the main event of the 81st Anniversary Show, Atlantis. Atlantis won the Lucha de Apuestas match and, as a result, La Sombra was forced to unmask and reveal his real name. In early November, La Sombra and Rush began having issues with each other, which led to a match between the two on November 13, where Rush was victorious. After the match, which turned out to be La Sombra's final with CMLL, the two founding members of Los Ingobernables made peace with each other.

New Japan Pro-Wrestling (2010–2015)
In 2010 La Sombra was selected to be the CMLL representative for New Japan Pro-Wrestling's (NJPW) Best of the Super Juniors XVII (BOSJ) tournament that took place from May 30 to June 16, 2010, in Japan. The tournament marked the first time that La Sombra toured Japan. On May 30, 2010, La Sombra wrestled his first match in the tournament, defeating Tiger Mask. On the final day of the tournament he defeated the junior heavyweight wrestling innovator, Jyushin Thunder Liger. With just three wins in the tournament and a total of six points, he did not advance to the semi-finals. In November 2010 La Sombra and Máscara Dorada took part in New Japan's five-day-long Super J Tag League. After winning two out of their four matches in the group stage, La Sombra and Dorada finished third in their block, missing the finals of the tournament.

La Sombra and Dorada returned to New Japan on January 4, 2011, at Wrestle Kingdom V in Tokyo Dome, where they defeated Jyushin Thunder Liger and Héctor Garza in a tag team match, when Sombra pinned Liger. As a result of his victory he was granted a match for Liger's CMLL World Middleweight Championship in the process. La Sombra received his match for the championship on January 22, 2011, at Fantastica Mania 2011, but lost to Liger. La Sombra returned to NJPW in August 2011 to take part in the 2011 G1 Climax. La Sombra started the tournament by picking up wins over Wataru Inoue and fellow CMLL worker Strong Man, but then went on to lose his remaining seven matches in the tournament, finishing eighth out of the ten wrestlers in his block. La Sombra returned to Japan in January 2012 to take part in the Fantastica Mania 2012 events. In the main event of the second night of the tour, La Sombra successfully defended the NWA World Historic Welterweight Championship against Volador Jr. La Sombra returned to New Japan in April 2012 to take part in the 2012 New Japan Cup. After defeating Yoshi-Hashi in his first round match, he was eliminated from the tournament in the second round by Hirooki Goto.

In January 2013, La Sombra took part in the three-day Fantastica Mania 2013 event. During the second night of the tour, La Sombra unsuccessfully challenged Nakamura for the IWGP Intercontinental Championship. During the third and final night, La Sombra defeated Dragón Rojo Jr. to win the NWA World Historic Middleweight Championship. On May 31, 2013, La Sombra defeated Nakamura in a rematch in Mexico City to win the IWGP Intercontinental Champion, becoming the first Mexican to hold that championship. On July 20, he lost the IWGP Intercontinental Championship back to Nakamura during a tour of Japan. From November 23 to December 6, La Sombra took part in the 2013 World Tag League, where he and Tetsuya Naito finished with a record of three wins and three losses, failing to advance to the semifinals. In January 2014, La Sombra took part in the five-day Fantastica Mania 2014 tour. La Sombra returned to New Japan in November to take part in the 2014 World Tag League, teaming with Tetsuya Naito once more. The team finished in the middle of their block with four wins and three losses. In January 2015, La Sombra returned to Japan to take part in the Fantastica Mania 2015 tour, during which he feuded with Máscara Dorada, culminating in a singles match between the two on January 19, where La Sombra was victorious.

WWE

Early feuds (2015–2017)
On November 19, 2015, Andrade signed a developmental contract with WWE. He later reported to the WWE Performance Center to begin his WWE career, focusing initially on improving his English language skills with the help of Sarah Stock, a WWE trainer who worked for CMLL for almost a decade. He made his WWE in-ring debut at an NXT house show in Tampa, Florida on January 8, 2016, wrestling under the name "Manny Andrade" and defeating Riddick Moss. He made his NXT TakeOver debut at NXT TakeOver: Dallas on April 1, where he defeated Christopher Girard during a dark match.

The following month, Andrade was given the new ring name Andrade "Cien" Almas (Spanish for Andrade "100" Almas). At NXT TakeOver: The End on June 8, Almas defeated Tye Dillinger. At NXT TakeOver: Brooklyn II on August 20, Almas was defeated by the debutant Bobby Roode. On October 5 episode of NXT, after losing to The Revival in the first round of the Dusty Rhodes Tag Team Classic, Almas took out his frustrations by attacking his tag team partner Cedric Alexander, thus turning heel in the process. By defeating No Way Jose on December 14 episode of NXT, Almas qualified for a fatal four-way match to determine a new number one contender to the NXT Championship but was eliminated by Roderick Strong. At NXT TakeOver: San Antonio on January 28, 2017, Almas was defeated by Roderick Strong.

NXT Champion (2017–2018)

On the July 19 episode of NXT, Almas appeared with an unidentified woman and attacked Cezar Bononi before threatening No Way Jose, though Almas ran away when Jose ran back into the ring. After being absent from in-ring competition, Almas returned being accompanied by the woman who turned out to be his new manager Zelina Vega, defeating Jose on the August 9 episode of NXT and pacting a match at NXT TakeOver: Brooklyn III against Johnny Gargano on August 19, which Almas won. Almas returned on the October 11 episode of NXT, where he once again defeated Gargano. On the November 1 episode of NXT, Almas signed a contract where he pacted a match against Drew McIntyre for the NXT Championship, before attacking him later that night. On November 18 at NXT TakeOver: WarGames, Almas defeated McIntyre to become the new NXT Champion.

On January 27, 2018, at NXT TakeOver: Philadelphia, Almas successfully defended the title against Johnny Gargano. Almas's match with Gargano at TakeOver: Philadelphia was highly acclaimed, earning five stars from Wrestling Observer Newsletter journalist Dave Meltzer, making it the first match in NXT history to receive a five-star rating. On January 28, at the Royal Rumble, Almas made his first main roster appearance entering as a surprise entrant at number 7 during the Royal Rumble match, in which he eliminated Kofi Kingston before being eliminated by Randy Orton. On February 3 during an NXT house show, Almas teamed with Zelina Vega in her first match as part of the company, in which they were defeated by Johnny Gargano and Candice LeRae. On February 21 episode of NXT, Almas retained the title against Gargano after interference from Tommaso Ciampa. At NXT TakeOver: New Orleans on April 7, Almas lost the NXT Championship to Aleister Black, ending his reign at 140 days. On April 18 episode of NXT, Almas accompanied Zelina Vega during her first televised match against Candice LeRae, in which she was defeated and this turned out to be Almas' and Vega's last appearances on NXT.

Various feuds (2018–2019)

On April 17, 2018, Almas, alongside Zelina Vega, was drafted to SmackDown brand as part of the Superstar Shake–up. A month later, in his in-ring debut, Almas defeated a local wrestler on the May 15 episode of SmackDown Live. Shortly after his debut, Almas was placed in his first feud with Sin Cara, who tried to convince him to "reconnect" again only for Almas to attack him. Almas defeated Sin Cara on July 10 episode of SmackDown Live and again five days later in a rematch at the Extreme Rules Kickoff Show to end their feud. On July 17 episode of SmackDown Live, Almas suffered his first loss as part of main roster by then–WWE Champion AJ Styles in a non–title match. Throughout August, Almas and Vega started a feud with Rusev and Lana whom they would defeat in various singles matches. This led to a mixed tag team match between the two teams on the Kickoff Show for SummerSlam on August 19, where Almas and Vega were victorious. Two days later on SmackDown Live, Almas and Vega lost to Rusev and Lana in a rematch, ending their feud in the process. Throughout the rest of the year, Almas continued to perform in various singles and tag team matches, most of which he would go on to lose.

On January 15, 2019, his ring name was shortened to Andrade, and he was announced as an entrant for the Royal Rumble match, where he was one of the final four, before being eliminated by Braun Strowman. A match between Andrade and Rey Mysterio was scheduled for the Fastlane pay-per-view, but it was cancelled in favor of both men competing in a fatal four-way match for the United States Championship, where Samoa Joe retained in a match also involving R-Truth. At WrestleMania 35, Andrade competed in the André the Giant Memorial Battle Royal, but failed to win after he accidentally eliminated himself, when he eliminated Apollo Crews. On April 15, both Andrade and Vega were drafted to Raw brand as part of Superstar Shake-up. However, on April 23, Andrade and Vega were moved back to the SmackDown brand. At the Money in the Bank, Andrade competed in the ladder match, which he failed to win. At Super ShowDown, Andrade failed to capture the Intercontinental Championship from Finn Bálor. In August, Andrade competed in the King of the Ring tournament, where he defeated Apollo Crews in the first round, but lost to Chad Gable in the quarterfinals.

United States Champion and teaming with Angel Garza (2019–2021)
As part of the 2019 draft, Andrade and Vega were drafted to Raw. On December 26, during a house show at Madison Square Garden, Andrade defeated Rey Mysterio to win the United States Championship for the first time. Andrade successfully retained the title against Mysterio on the January 6, 2020 and January 20 episodes of Raw. At the Royal Rumble on January 26, Andrade defeated Humberto Carrillo to retain his championship. The next day, Andrade was suspended for 30 days, for violating WWE's Wellness Policy. To write him off television, an angle took place on Raw, where Carrillo delivered a Hammerlock DDT on Andrade onto cement.

With Andrade absent over the next month, Zelina Vega brought up her new associate, Angel Garza, who is Carrillo's cousin, and the two then feuded. Andrade returned at Super ShowDown, competing in the gauntlet match for the Tuwaiq Trophy, but was eliminated by R-Truth. At Elimination Chamber, Andrade retained his title against Carrillo once again. Andrade was scheduled to team with Garza to face The Street Profits (Angelo Dawkins and Montez Ford) for the Raw Tag Team Championship at WrestleMania 36, but Andrade was removed from that match due to an injury and was replaced by Austin Theory. On the April 13 episode of Raw, Andrade, Garza and Theory attacked Akira Tozawa, creating a new faction. However, this would be short-lived, as Theory was kicked out of the faction on the May 18 episode of Raw. On the May 25 episode of Raw, Andrade lost the United States Championship to Apollo Crews, ending his reign at 151 days. He failed to regain the title from Crews at Backlash, after failed interference from Garza.

Andrade began a tag team with Garza, including a title match against The Street Profits at SummerSlam and Clash of Champions, where they were unsuccessful. After these failures, Zelina Vega left the group and on the October 12 episode of Raw, Andrade lost to Garza before allowing him and Vega to be attacked by The Fiend and Alexa Bliss, thus officially splitting up the team. This would wind up being his final WWE match as Andrade disappeared from WWE programming soon after while Vega was released in November. In March 2021, Andrade requested his release from WWE and was initially denied, but WWE eventually granted his release on March 21.

Lucha Libre AAA Worldwide (2021–2022) 
On May 2, 2021, Andrade appeared via video package on Lucha Libre AAA Worldwide's Rey de Reyes show, challenging AAA Mega Champion Kenny Omega to a championship match at Triplemanía XXIX. On May 18, the match was officially announced. At the event, Andrade, accompanied by Ric Flair, was defeated by Omega.

On April 30, 2022, at Triplemanía XXX: Monterrey, Andrade, who was teamed with Cibernético and Deonna Purrazzo, was defeated by Bandido, Taya, and Pagano in a trios match.

All Elite Wrestling (2021–present) 
Andrade made his debut for All Elite Wrestling (AEW) on the June 4, 2021 episode of Dynamite, under the new ring name "Andrade El Idolo". He allied himself with Vickie Guerrero, who would serve as his manager. At the Road Rager event on July 7, Andrade made his in-ring debut for AEW, defeating Matt Sydal. Later that month, he would end his affiliation with Vickie Guerrero, and introduced her nephew Chavo Guerrero as his new "consultant". In August, Andrade began a feud with Pac, leading to a match on the September 10 episode of Rampage, which Andrade won; after the match he would attack Chavo, ending their partnership. On the October 6 episode of Dynamite, Andrade competed in a Casino Ladder Match for an opportunity at the AEW World Championship, but the match was won by Adam Page.

Professional wrestling persona

Throughout his career, Andrade has portrayed two main characters, La Sombra and Andrade "Cien" Almas, with both of those characters having phases of being heroic and villainous.

From 2007 through 2014, Andrade portrayed the masked character "La Sombra" as a heroic, young, high-flying wrestler who used a lot of lucha libre moves, especially dives off the top rope and occasionally out of the ring to the floor. At the time, he often used a split-legged corkscrew senton dive off the top rope to finish his matches.

When he transitioned from a face to a heel character in 2014, he developed a more individual personality, acting cockier and more laid back in the ring, acting unimpressed with his opponents by adopting a more arrogant tranquilo attitude that became synonymous with all the Los Ingobernables members. As a heel, he began using the Sombra Driver (sometimes referred to as the Shadow Driver), a Schoolboy suplex, that illustrated his transition from high-flyer to a more power-based wrestler.

Initially, the Andrade "Cien" Almas character was portrayed as a face, although without much depth to the character. His heel turn in 2016 saw a return of the arrogant tranquilo character he had used with success while working as "La Sombra", now bolstered by the presence of manager Zelina Vega, who helped him win matches by unfair means. After his heel turn, Andrade often used a running double knee smash against an opponent sitting in the corner of the ring, or sometimes on an opponent leaning against the ring post on the outside of the ring. After his heel turn, he began using a hammerlock DDT (which he named La Sombra) as a finisher. As of his debut at AEW Road Rager, Andrade would enter the ring wearing a white suit with black stripes and a black skeleton mask, resembling DC Comics supervillain Black Mask.

Other media 
Andrade is a playable character in the video games WWE 2K19 and WWE 2K20.

Personal life 
In February 2019, Andrade began dating fellow professional wrestler Charlotte Flair. The couple got engaged on January 1, 2020, and they got married on May 27, 2022, in Mexico.

Championships and accomplishments 

CBS Sports
NXT Match of the Year (2018) 
 Consejo Mundial de Lucha Libre
 CMLL Universal Championship (2011)
 CMLL World Tag Team Championship (1 time) – with Volador Jr.
 CMLL World Trios Championship (1 time) – with Máscara Dorada and La Máscara
 Mexican National Trios Championship (1 time) – with El Sagrado and Volador Jr.
 NWA World Welterweight Championship (1 time)
 NWA World Historic Middleweight Championship (1 time)
 NWA World Historic Welterweight Championship (2 times)
 La Copa Junior (2012)
 Cuadrangular de Parejas (2014) – with Omar Brunetti
 Reyes del Aire (2013, 2015)
 Torneo Corona (2008) – with Metalik
 Torneo Gran Alternativa (2007) – with Místico
 Torneo Nacional de Parejas Increibles (2013) – with Volador Jr.
 CMLL Bodybuilding Contest (2012 – Advanced)
 CMLL Tag Team of the Year (2009) – with Volador Jr.
 CMLL Technico of the Year (2010)
 CMLL Trio of the Year (2010) – with Máscara Dorada and La Máscara
 Lucha Libre Azteca
 LLA Azteca Championship (1 time)
 New Japan Pro-Wrestling
 IWGP Intercontinental Championship (1 time)
Pro Wrestling Illustrated
 Ranked No. 13 of the top 500 singles wrestlers in the PWI 500 in 2018
 WWE
 NXT Championship (1 time)
WWE United States Championship (1 time)
NXT Year-End Award for Match of the Year (2018)

Luchas de Apuestas record

Notes

References

External links 

 
 
 
 

1989 births
All Elite Wrestling personnel
Expatriate professional wrestlers
Expatriate professional wrestlers in Japan
IWGP Intercontinental champions
Living people
Masked wrestlers
Mexican expatriate sportspeople in the United States
Mexican male professional wrestlers
NWA/WCW/WWE United States Heavyweight Champions
NXT Champions
People from Gómez Palacio, Durango
Professional wrestlers from Durango
21st-century professional wrestlers
Mexican National Trios Champions
CMLL World Tag Team Champions
CMLL World Trios Champions
NWA World Historic Middleweight Champions
NWA World Historic Welterweight Champions
NWA World Welterweight Champions